Tillandsia mollis is a plant species in the genus Tillandsia. This species is endemic to Bolivia.

References

mollis
Flora of Bolivia